ZK-283197 (also known as BAY 86-5310 or SH-T04211C) is a selective and orally active ERβ agonist which was under development by Bayer Healthcare AG for the treatment of vasomotor symptoms. It reached phase II clinical trials prior to the discontinuation of its development. Its development was terminated in 2014.

References

Abandoned drugs
Drugs with undisclosed chemical structures
Selective ERβ agonists
Synthetic estrogens